Battle of Patras or Siege of Patras can refer to one of a number of military engagements at or near the city of Patras in the northwestern Peloponnese in Greece:

 Siege of Patras (805 or 807), by the Slavs of the Peloponnese and Saracens
 Siege of Patras (1429), by the Byzantine Despot of the Morea, Constantine XI Palaiologos
 Battle of Patras (1687), battle between the Ottoman and Venetian armies during the Morean War
 Battle of Patras (1770), by the Russians and Greek rebels during the Orlov Revolt
 Battle of Patras (1772), naval battle between the Ottoman and Russian fleets
 Siege of Patras (1821), by the Greek rebels during the early days of the Greek War of Independence
 Battle of Patras (1822), naval battle between the Ottoman and Greek fleets during the Greek War of Independence